Edwin Lyle Salisbury (May 31, 1910 – November 22, 1986) was an American rower who competed in the 1932 Summer Olympics.

Salisbury was born in California. In 1932, he won the gold medal as member of the University of California at Berkeley team, which competed for the US in the eights competition. In 1969 the team and its members were entered into the National Rowing Foundation's Rowing Hall of Fame. 

Salisbury died in Sacramento at the age of 76.

References

1910 births
1986 deaths
American male rowers
Rowers at the 1932 Summer Olympics
Olympic gold medalists for the United States in rowing
Medalists at the 1932 Summer Olympics